State Road 10, or referred to as Belgrade – Vatin road ( / Put Beograd – Vatin), is state road, class I-b/expressway in northern Serbia, connecting Belgrade with Romania at Vatin border crossing. It runs through the southern Banat region.

The existing route is a road with two traffic lanes, except for Belgrade (Krnjača) – Pančevo (Kovačica) section, which is built in dual-carriageway 2+1 configuration, similar to expressway.

The road is a part of European route E70.

Sections

Planned motorway 
According to the Space Plan of Republic of Serbia, the motorway construction is being planned, side-by-side with the existing route. The given section would start at Belgrade bypass (which would include Pančevo from the "Pančevo-north" interchange), and end at the border with Romania. The planned highway would go south of existing route until Alibunar, and then north until Vatin, where it would be connected to Romania's also-planned A9 motorway and the rest of the Romanian road network.

See also 
 European route E70
 Roads in Serbia
 National Road (M)1.9

References

External links 
 Official website - Roads of Serbia (Putevi Srbije)
 Official website – Corridors of Serbia (Koridori Srbije) (Serbian)

Expressways in Serbia
State roads in Serbia